Jennifer "Gin" Cooley is an American model, psychotherapist, composer and vocalist. Cooley has appeared in several popular music videos, including cameos for Casey James’ "Let's Don't Call it a Night" Rodney Atkins’ "Take a Back Road,"; Joe Nichols’ "Take It Off"; Jason Aldean's "Take a Little Ride" and landed the lead role for Lady Antebellum’s hit song "Wanted You More."

Her music video, "Pocket Full of Hope" was an Official Selection and "Royal Reel Award" winner at the 2013 Canada International Film Festival in Vancouver, Canada.

Early life and education
Gin is a native of Paris, Tennessee and is the daughter of Tammy Muench. She graduated high school at 16 from Gateway Christian Academy and attended Murray State University where she studied Fine Art but suspended her studies to focus on her modeling career. She received a Bachelor of Science in Business and Organizational Management magna cum laude from Bethel University (Tennessee) as well as a master's degree in Psychology with a focus in Clinical Mental Health from the University of Tennessee at Martin. In 2019, Gin was accepted into the Doctor of Psychology program at Western Kentucky University, with focus in applied psychology.

Modeling career

2002–present

Cooley started her modeling career at 16, signing with BMG Chicago. Two months later she dropped BMG and signed with industry expert and manager, the late JJ Cortez in New York City. At 17, she signed with Elite Model Management Singapore, which launched her international career. She walked for Christian Dior's "Hardcore" show not even 3 months on the scene. She was represented by LookNow in Milan, Italy and later signed with Riccardo Gay walking in Milan Fashion Week seasons 2003, 2004 and 2005. She also had representation in Shanghai, China (ENVY Models), Taipei, Taiwan (FMI) and New York City (Women Management). She resided in Italy during the height of her fashion career and worked exclusively in the European market until her return to the United States. Gin appeared in various editorials for designers including Gucci, Prada, Miu Miu, Alexander McQueen, Donna Karan, Christian Dior, Louis Vuitton, Issey Miyake, Armani and Chanel. From 2009 to 2016 she was based out of Nashville, Tennessee with Wilhelmina Models/Dan Agency and was a featured cameo in several top country music video hits.

Filmography

Music videos

Film Festivals

Premieres and screenings

"Pocket Full of Hope" is a music video for a song that Gin composed and produced herself with the most nominal, obsolete equipment in rural West Tennessee. It is directed by indie film maker Jeff Wyatt Wilson and was an Official Selection and "Royal Reel Award" winner at the 2013 Canada International Film Festival in Vancouver, Canada. Gin plays herself in the video."Pocket Full of Hope" also screened as an Official Selection at the 2013 Memphis International Film and Music Festival at Purple Haze on Beale Street in Memphis, Tennessee.

"Oval Room" is a musical short which Cooley co-directed by Jeff Wyatt Wilson, world premiered at the 2015 Mykonos Biennale on July 4 in Mykonos, Greece . Gin recorded and produced the song herself with "yardsale electronics" in rural West Tennessee. "Oval Room" was originally written by Blaze Foley. She plays herself in the video. "Oval Room"'s Canadian premier was held on September 10 at the 2015 Toronto Independent Film Festival at the Carlton Cinema in Toronto, Canada. The U.S. premiere of "Oval Room" took place at the Harlem International Film Festival on September 12, 2015 at the Maysles Cinema in New York City. Oval Room screened at the San Pedro International Film Festival on October 11, 2015 in San Pedro, Los Angeles at the legendary Warner Grand Theatre. In February 2016, "Oval Room" was an Official Selection in the Honorable Mentioned category at the 11th Annual Socal Film Festival in Huntington Beach, California.

Discography

Awards and nominations

Philanthropy
In 2016, Gin founded a child advocacy group "Gin Cooley's Fine Art Revival" which consists of a celebration and collaboration of visual arts through fine and expressive art mediums to raise funds, awareness and provide information to victims of child abuse, children in high risk situations and various children's charities.

External links

 Gin Cooley's Official Website

References

Female models from Tennessee
American women singers
Living people
People from Paris, Tennessee
University of Tennessee at Martin alumni
Year of birth missing (living people)
21st-century American women